The term "Japanese iris" encompasses three species of Irises cultivated in gardens or growing wild in Japan: hanashōbu (Iris ensata), kakitsubata (Iris laevigata) and ayame (Iris sanguinea). Of these three species, I. ensata is the one most commonly referred to as "Japanese iris" outside Japan. 

The bluish purple color of the flowers of the Japanese garden iris is an example of the copigmentation phenomenon.

Hanashōbu
The  grows in the wet land and is the most extensively cultivated variety in Japanese gardens. According to the place where it was cultivated, it is classified into the Edo (Tokyo), Higo (Kumamoto Prefecture), Ise (Mie Prefecture), American (U.S.) and other series. It is extensively grown in gardens throughout the temperate zones. Several cultivars have been selected, of which 'Rose Queen' and 'Variegata' have gained the Royal Horticultural Society's Award of Garden Merit.

Kakitsubata
The  grows in the semi-wet land and is less popular, but is also cultivated extensively.

It is a prefectural flower of Aichi Prefecture due to the famous tanka poem which is said to have been written in this area during the Heian period, as it appears in The Tales of Ise by Ariwara no Narihira (note that the beginning syllables are "ka-ki-tsu-ha (ba)-ta"):

Kakitsubata at Ōta Shrine, Kyoto, is a National Natural Treasure. It was already recorded in a tanka by Fujiwara Toshinari also in the Heian period:

Ayame
The  is the iris typically growing wild on the dry land in Japan.

Characteristics

Note: Sweet flag, called shōbu in Japanese, is a plant belonging to the family Acoraceae, genus Acorus, known for its fragrant roots, rather than its flowers.

See also
Iris (plant)

References

External links
 Japanese Iris/Hanashobu Wall Paper Files (in Japanese)
 Japanese Iris/Hanashobu Photo Album 1 (in Japanese)
 Japanese Iris/Hanashobu Photo Album 2 (in Japanese)

Plant common names